Absolutely Charming (simplified Chinese: 糊里糊涂爱上它) is a Singaporean Chinese fantasy drama which will be telecast on Singapore's free-to-air channel, MediaCorp Channel 8. It stars Cherry Hsia, Elvin Ng, Zhou Ying, Zhang Zhenhuan, Rebecca Lim, Richard Low and Patricia Mok as the cast of this series. The series was repeated at 7am on Mediacorp Channel 8 on weekends.

Plot
Hu Liqin, a Fox Spirit, is banished to Earth for being unable to suppress her feelings of love in heavens. The only way she would be permitted back to the Celestial Court was if she could find a man who is willing to sacrifice his life to love and protect her.

Cast

 Cherry Hsia as Hu Liqin, a fox spirit.
 Elvin Ng as Song Haomin, one of the designers at Foxy
 Zhou Ying as Xie Enlin, one of the designers at Foxy 
 Zhang Zhen Huan as Wu Zikang, one of the designers at Foxy 
 Rebecca Lim as Song Xinmei, owner of Fragrance Inn
 Richard Low as Song Tiancheng
 Patricia Mok as Liu Bingbing
 Jason Lee Kok Yang as Song Renjie

Production 
The drama series was announced in August 2011 with Jeanette Aw and Tay Ping Hui as the main lead characters. In January 2012, it was announced the lead characters were changed to Cherry Hsia and Elvin Ng respectively. Channel 8 responded that they changed Aw out to prevent viewers' fatigue of constantly seeing Aw on television and also the network is producing a new series, Beyond, which stars Aw. Fans and viewers protested the reasoning, citing there was only two drama series, Rescue 995 and Jump!, featuring Aw on two different networks and comparing to Rui En, Rui En had more series showing on the same time period.

The drama series was originally titled 我爱狐狸精 but was renamed 糊里糊涂爱上它 (Absolutely Charming).

Episodes

References

Singapore Chinese dramas
2012 Singaporean television series debuts
Channel 8 (Singapore) original programming